Alekseevka is a rural locality (a village) and the administrative centre of Alekseevka Selsoviet, Ufimsky District, Bashkortostan, Russia. The population was 4,611 as of 2010. There are 34 streets.

Geography 
Alexeyevka is located 15 km north of Ufa (the district's administrative centre) by road. Tarbeyevka is the nearest rural locality.

References 

Rural localities in Ufimsky District